Machmell River Cone is a cinder cone in the Silverthrone Caldera complex in the Pacific Ranges section of the Coast Mountains in British Columbia, Canada. It is believed the volcano last erupted during the Holocene, making it one of the most recent eruptions of the Silverthrone complex.

See also
Machmell River
List of volcanoes in Canada
Garibaldi Volcanic Belt
Cascade Volcanic Arc
Volcanism of Canada
Volcanism of Western Canada

References

Cinder cones of British Columbia
Garibaldi Volcanic Belt
Parasitic cones
Holocene volcanoes